Outer space, commonly shortened to space, is the expanse that exists beyond Earth and its atmosphere and between celestial bodies. Outer space is not completely empty; it is a near-perfect vacuum containing a low density of particles, predominantly a plasma of hydrogen and helium, as well as electromagnetic radiation, magnetic fields, neutrinos, dust, and cosmic rays.

The plasma between galaxies is thought to account for about half of the baryonic (ordinary) matter in the universe, having a number density of less than one hydrogen atom per cubic metre and a kinetic temperature of millions of kelvins. Local concentrations of matter have condensed into stars and galaxies. Intergalactic space takes up most of the volume of the universe, but even galaxies and star systems consist almost entirely of empty space. Most of the remaining mass-energy in the observable universe is made up of an unknown form, dubbed dark matter and dark energy.

Outer space does not begin at a definite altitude above Earth's surface. Certain portions of the upper stratosphere and the mesosphere are sometimes referred to as "near space". The framework for international space law was established by the Outer Space Treaty, which entered into force on 10 October 1967. This treaty precludes any claims of national sovereignty and permits all states to freely explore outer space. Despite the drafting of UN resolutions for the peaceful uses of outer space, anti-satellite weapons have been tested in Earth orbit.

Humans began the physical exploration of space during the 20th century with the advent of high-altitude balloon flights. This was followed by crewed rocket flights and, then, crewed Earth orbit, first achieved by Yuri Gagarin of the Soviet Union in 1961. The economic cost of putting objects, including humans, into space is very high, limiting human spaceflight to low Earth orbit and the Moon. On the other hand, uncrewed spacecraft have reached all of the known planets in the Solar System. Outer space represents a challenging environment for human exploration because of the hazards of vacuum and radiation. Microgravity has a negative effect on human physiology that causes both muscle atrophy and bone loss.

Formation and state 

The size of the whole universe is unknown, and it might be infinite in extent. According to the Big Bang theory, the very early Universe was an extremely hot and dense state about 13.8 billion years ago which rapidly expanded. About 380,000 years later the Universe had cooled sufficiently to allow protons and electrons to combine and form hydrogen—the so-called recombination epoch. When this happened, matter and energy became decoupled, allowing photons to travel freely through the continually expanding space. Matter that remained following the initial expansion has since undergone gravitational collapse to create stars, galaxies and other astronomical objects, leaving behind a deep vacuum that forms what is now called outer space. As light has a finite velocity, this theory also constrains the size of the directly observable universe.

The present day shape of the universe has been determined from measurements of the cosmic microwave background using satellites like the Wilkinson Microwave Anisotropy Probe. These observations indicate that the spatial geometry of the observable universe is "flat", meaning that photons on parallel paths at one point remain parallel as they travel through space to the limit of the observable universe, except for local gravity. The flat Universe, combined with the measured mass density of the Universe and the accelerating expansion of the Universe, indicates that space has a non-zero vacuum energy, which is called dark energy.

Estimates put the average energy density of the present day Universe at the equivalent of 5.9 protons per cubic meter, including dark energy, dark matter, and baryonic matter (ordinary matter composed of atoms). The atoms account for only 4.6% of the total energy density, or a density of one proton per four cubic meters. The density of the Universe is clearly not uniform; it ranges from relatively high density in galaxies—including very high density in structures within galaxies, such as planets, stars, and black holes—to conditions in vast voids that have much lower density, at least in terms of visible matter. Unlike matter and dark matter, dark energy seems not to be concentrated in galaxies: although dark energy may account for a majority of the mass-energy in the Universe, dark energy's influence is 5 orders of magnitude smaller than the influence of gravity from matter and dark matter within the Milky Way.

Environment 

Outer space is the closest known approximation to a perfect vacuum. It has effectively no friction, allowing stars, planets, and moons to move freely along their ideal orbits, following the initial formation stage. The deep vacuum of intergalactic space is not devoid of matter, as it contains a few hydrogen atoms per cubic meter. By comparison, the air humans breathe contains about 1025 molecules per cubic meter. The low density of matter in outer space means that electromagnetic radiation can travel great distances without being scattered: the mean free path of a photon in intergalactic space is about 1023 km, or 10 billion light years. In spite of this, extinction, which is the absorption and scattering of photons by dust and gas, is an important factor in galactic and intergalactic astronomy.

Stars, planets, and moons retain their atmospheres by gravitational attraction. Atmospheres have no clearly delineated upper boundary: the density of atmospheric gas gradually decreases with distance from the object until it becomes indistinguishable from outer space. Above this altitude, isotropic gas pressure rapidly becomes insignificant when compared to radiation pressure from the Sun and the dynamic pressure of the solar wind. The thermosphere in this range has large gradients of pressure, temperature and composition, and varies greatly due to space weather.

The temperature of outer space is measured in terms of the kinetic activity of the gas, as it is on Earth. The radiation of outer space has a different temperature than the kinetic temperature of the gas, meaning that the gas and radiation are not in thermodynamic equilibrium. All of the observable universe is filled with photons that were created during the Big Bang, which is known as the cosmic microwave background radiation (CMB). (There is quite likely a correspondingly large number of neutrinos called the cosmic neutrino background.) The gas temperatures in outer space can vary widely. For example, the temperature in the Boomerang Nebula is 1 K, while the solar corona reaches temperatures over 1.2–2.6 million K.

Magnetic fields have been detected in the space around just about every class of celestial object. Star formation in spiral galaxies can generate small-scale dynamos, creating turbulent magnetic field strengths of around 5–10 μG. The Davis–Greenstein effect causes elongated dust grains to align themselves with a galaxy's magnetic field, resulting in weak optical polarization. This has been used to show ordered magnetic fields exist in several nearby galaxies. Magneto-hydrodynamic processes in active elliptical galaxies produce their characteristic jets and radio lobes. Non-thermal radio sources have been detected even among the most distant, high-z sources, indicating the presence of magnetic fields.

Outside a protective atmosphere and magnetic field, there are few obstacles to the passage through space of energetic subatomic particles known as cosmic rays. These particles have energies ranging from about 106 eV up to an extreme 1020 eV of ultra-high-energy cosmic rays. The peak flux of cosmic rays occurs at energies of about 109 eV, with approximately 87% protons, 12% helium nuclei and 1% heavier nuclei. In the high energy range, the flux of electrons is only about 1% of that of protons. Cosmic rays can damage electronic components and pose a health threat to space travelers. According to astronauts, like Don Pettit, space has a burned/metallic odor that clings to their suits and equipment, similar to the scent of an arc welding torch.

Effect on biology and human bodies 

Despite the harsh environment, several life forms have been found that can withstand extreme space conditions for extended periods. Species of lichen carried on the ESA BIOPAN facility survived exposure for ten days in 2007. Seeds of Arabidopsis thaliana and Nicotiana tabacum germinated after being exposed to space for 1.5 years. A strain of Bacillus subtilis has survived 559 days when exposed to low Earth orbit or a simulated martian environment. The lithopanspermia hypothesis suggests that rocks ejected into outer space from life-harboring planets may successfully transport life forms to another habitable world. A conjecture is that just such a scenario occurred early in the history of the Solar System, with potentially microorganism-bearing rocks being exchanged between Venus, Earth, and Mars.

Even at relatively low altitudes in the Earth's atmosphere, conditions are hostile to the human body. The altitude where atmospheric pressure matches the vapor pressure of water at the temperature of the human body is called the Armstrong line, named after American physician Harry G. Armstrong. At or above the Armstrong line, fluids in the throat and lungs boil away. More specifically, exposed bodily liquids such as saliva, tears, and liquids in the lungs boil away. Hence, at this altitude, human survival requires a pressure suit, or a pressurized capsule.

Out in space, sudden exposure of an unprotected human to very low pressure, such as during a rapid decompression, can cause pulmonary barotrauma—a rupture of the lungs, due to the large pressure differential between inside and outside the chest. Even if the subject's airway is fully open, the flow of air through the windpipe may be too slow to prevent the rupture. Rapid decompression can rupture eardrums and sinuses, bruising and blood seep can occur in soft tissues, and shock can cause an increase in oxygen consumption that leads to hypoxia.

As a consequence of rapid decompression, oxygen dissolved in the blood empties into the lungs to try to equalize the partial pressure gradient. Once the deoxygenated blood arrives at the brain, humans lose consciousness after a few seconds and die of hypoxia within minutes. Blood and other body fluids boil when the pressure drops below 6.3 kPa, and this condition is called ebullism. The steam may bloat the body to twice its normal size and slow circulation, but tissues are elastic and porous enough to prevent rupture. Ebullism is slowed by the pressure containment of blood vessels, so some blood remains liquid. Swelling and ebullism can be reduced by containment in a pressure suit. The Crew Altitude Protection Suit (CAPS), a fitted elastic garment designed in the 1960s for astronauts, prevents ebullism at pressures as low as 2 kPa. Most space suits use around 30–39 kPa of pure oxygen, about the same as on the Earth's surface. This pressure is high enough to prevent ebullism, but evaporation of nitrogen dissolved in the blood could still cause decompression sickness and gas embolisms if not managed.

Humans evolved for life in Earth gravity, and exposure to weightlessness has been shown to have deleterious effects on human health. Initially, more than 50% of astronauts experience space motion sickness. This can cause nausea and vomiting, vertigo, headaches, lethargy, and overall malaise. The duration of space sickness varies, but it typically lasts for 1–3 days, after which the body adjusts to the new environment. Longer-term exposure to weightlessness results in muscle atrophy and deterioration of the skeleton, or spaceflight osteopenia. These effects can be minimized through a regimen of exercise. Other effects include fluid redistribution, slowing of the cardiovascular system, decreased production of red blood cells, balance disorders, and a weakening of the immune system. Lesser symptoms include loss of body mass, nasal congestion, sleep disturbance, and puffiness of the face.

During long-duration space travel, radiation can pose an acute health hazard. Exposure to high-energy, ionizing cosmic rays can result in fatigue, nausea, vomiting, as well as damage to the immune system and changes to the white blood cell count. Over longer durations, symptoms include an increased risk of cancer, plus damage to the eyes, nervous system, lungs and the gastrointestinal tract. On a round-trip Mars mission lasting three years, a large fraction of the cells in an astronaut's body would be traversed and potentially damaged by high energy nuclei. The energy of such particles is significantly diminished by the shielding provided by the walls of a spacecraft and can be further diminished by water containers and other barriers. The impact of the cosmic rays upon the shielding produces additional radiation that can affect the crew. Further research is needed to assess the radiation hazards and determine suitable countermeasures.

Boundary 

There is no clear boundary between Earth's atmosphere and space, as the density of the atmosphere gradually decreases as the altitude increases. There are several standard boundary designations, namely:
Astronaut wings are now only awarded to spacecraft crew members that "demonstrated activities during flight that were essential to public safety, or contributed to human space flight safety".

Legal status 

The Outer Space Treaty provides the basic framework for international space law. It covers the legal use of outer space by nation states, and includes in its definition of outer space, the Moon, and other celestial bodies. The treaty states that outer space is free for all nation states to explore and is not subject to claims of national sovereignty, calling outer space the "province of all mankind". This status as a common heritage of mankind has been used, though not without opposition, to enforce the right to access and shared use of outer space for all nations equally, particularly non-spacefaring nations. It also prohibits the development of nuclear weapons in outer space. The treaty was passed by the United Nations General Assembly in 1963 and signed in 1967 by the USSR, the United States of America and the United Kingdom. As of 2017, 105 state parties have either ratified or acceded to the treaty. An additional 25 states signed the treaty, without ratifying it.

Since 1958, outer space has been the subject of multiple United Nations resolutions. Of these, more than 50 have been concerning the international co-operation in the peaceful uses of outer space and preventing an arms race in space. Four additional space law treaties have been negotiated and drafted by the UN's Committee on the Peaceful Uses of Outer Space. Still, there remains no legal prohibition against deploying conventional weapons in space, and anti-satellite weapons have been successfully tested by the US, USSR, China, and in 2019, India. The 1979 Moon Treaty turned the jurisdiction of all heavenly bodies (including the orbits around such bodies) over to the international community. The treaty has not been ratified by any nation that currently practices human spaceflight.

In 1976, eight equatorial states (Ecuador, Colombia, Brazil, Congo, Zaire, Uganda, Kenya, and Indonesia) met in Bogotá, Colombia. With their "Declaration of the First Meeting of Equatorial Countries", or "the Bogotá Declaration", they claimed control of the segment of the geosynchronous orbital path corresponding to each country. These claims are not internationally accepted.

Earth orbit 

A spacecraft enters orbit when its centripetal acceleration due to gravity is less than or equal to the centrifugal acceleration due to the horizontal component of its velocity.

To achieve an orbit, a spacecraft must travel faster than a sub-orbital spaceflight. The rate of orbital decay depends on the satellite's cross-sectional area and mass, as well as variations in the air density of the upper atmosphere.

Regions 
Space is a partial vacuum: its different regions are defined by the various magnetic fields and "winds" that dominate within them, and extend to the point at which those fields give way to those beyond. Geospace extends from Earth's atmosphere to the outer reaches of Earth's magnetic field, whereupon it gives way to the solar wind of interplanetary space. Interplanetary space extends to the heliopause, whereupon the solar wind gives way to the magnetic fields of the interstellar medium. Interstellar space then continues to the outer fringes of the galaxy, where it fades into the intergalactic void.

Regions near the Earth 

Near-Earth space is the region of outer space above the Kármán line, from low Earth orbits out to geostationary orbits. This region includes the major orbits for artificial satellites and is the site of most of humanity's space activity. The region has seen high levels of space pollution, mainly in the form of space debris, threatening any space activity in this region.

Geospace is a region of outer space near Earth that includes the upper atmosphere and magnetosphere. The Van Allen radiation belts lie within the geospace. The outer boundary of geospace is the magnetopause, which forms an interface between the Earth's magnetosphere and the solar wind. The inner boundary is the ionosphere. The variable space-weather conditions of geospace are affected by the behavior of the Sun and the solar wind; the subject of geospace is interlinked with heliophysics—the study of the Sun and its impact on the planets of the Solar System.

The day-side magnetopause is compressed by solar-wind pressure—the subsolar distance from the center of the Earth is typically 10 Earth radii. On the night side, the solar wind stretches the magnetosphere to form a magnetotail that sometimes extends out to more than 100–200 Earth radii. For roughly four days of each month, the lunar surface is shielded from the solar wind as the Moon passes through the magnetotail.

Geospace is populated by electrically charged particles at very low densities, the motions of which are controlled by the Earth's magnetic field. These plasmas form a medium from which storm-like disturbances powered by the solar wind can drive electrical currents into the Earth's upper atmosphere. Geomagnetic storms can disturb two regions of geospace, the radiation belts and the ionosphere. These storms increase fluxes of energetic electrons that can permanently damage satellite electronics, interfering with shortwave radio communication and GPS location and timing. Magnetic storms can also be a hazard to astronauts, even in low Earth orbit. They also create aurorae seen at high latitudes in an oval surrounding the geomagnetic poles.

Although it meets the definition of outer space, the atmospheric density within the first few hundred kilometers above the Kármán line is still sufficient to produce significant drag on satellites. This region contains material left over from previous crewed and uncrewed launches that are a potential hazard to spacecraft. Some of this debris re-enters Earth's atmosphere periodically.

Translunar space is the region of lunar transfer orbits, between the Moon and Earth.

This is located beyond the orbit of the Moon and therefore includes cislunar space.

The region where Earth's gravity well remains dominant against gravitational perturbations from the Sun is the planet's Hill sphere. Beyond Earth's Hill sphere extends along Earth's orbital path its orbital and co-orbital space. This space is co-populated by groups of co-orbital Near-Earth Objects (NEOs), such as horseshoe librators and Earth trojans, with some NEOs at times becoming temporary satellites and quasi-moons to Earth.

Deep space is defined by the United States government as region of space beyond low-Earth orbit, including cislunar space. Others vary the starting point from beyond cislunar space to beyond the solar system.

Interplanetary space 

Interplanetary space is defined by the solar wind, a continuous stream of charged particles emanating from the Sun that creates a very tenuous atmosphere (the heliosphere) for billions of kilometers into space. Interplanetary space extends out to the heliopause where the influence of the galactic environment starts to dominate over the magnetic field and particle flux from the Sun. The distance and strength of the heliopause varies depending on the activity level of the solar wind. The heliopause in turn deflects away low-energy galactic cosmic rays, with this modulation effect peaking during solar maximum.

The volume of interplanetary space is a nearly total vacuum, with a mean free path of about one astronomical unit at the orbital distance of the Earth. This space is not completely empty, and is sparsely filled with cosmic rays, which include ionized atomic nuclei and various subatomic particles. There is also gas, plasma and dust, small meteors, and several dozen types of organic molecules discovered to date by microwave spectroscopy. A cloud of interplanetary dust is visible at night as a faint band called the zodiacal light.

Interplanetary space contains the magnetic field generated by the Sun. There are also magnetospheres generated by planets such as Jupiter, Saturn, Mercury and the Earth that have their own magnetic fields. These are shaped by the influence of the solar wind into the approximation of a teardrop shape, with the long tail extending outward behind the planet. These magnetic fields can trap particles from the solar wind and other sources, creating belts of charged particles such as the Van Allen radiation belts. Planets without magnetic fields, such as Mars, have their atmospheres gradually eroded by the solar wind.

Interstellar space 

Interstellar space is the physical space within a galaxy beyond the influence each star has upon the encompassed plasma. The contents of interstellar space are called the interstellar medium. Approximately 70% of the mass of the interstellar medium consists of lone hydrogen atoms; most of the remainder consists of helium atoms. This is enriched with trace amounts of heavier atoms formed through stellar nucleosynthesis. These atoms are ejected into the interstellar medium by stellar winds or when evolved stars begin to shed their outer envelopes such as during the formation of a planetary nebula. The cataclysmic explosion of a supernova generates an expanding shock wave consisting of ejected materials that further enrich the medium. The density of matter in the interstellar medium can vary considerably: the average is around 106 particles per m3, but cold molecular clouds can hold 108–1012 per m3.

A number of molecules exist in interstellar space, as can tiny 0.1 μm dust particles. The tally of molecules discovered through radio astronomy is steadily increasing at the rate of about four new species per year. Large regions of higher density matter known as molecular clouds allow chemical reactions to occur, including the formation of organic polyatomic species. Much of this chemistry is driven by collisions. Energetic cosmic rays penetrate the cold, dense clouds and ionize hydrogen and helium, resulting, for example, in the trihydrogen cation. An ionized helium atom can then split relatively abundant carbon monoxide to produce ionized carbon, which in turn can lead to organic chemical reactions.

The local interstellar medium is a region of space within 100 parsecs (pc) of the Sun, which is of interest both for its proximity and for its interaction with the Solar System. This volume nearly coincides with a region of space known as the Local Bubble, which is characterized by a lack of dense, cold clouds. It forms a cavity in the Orion Arm of the Milky Way galaxy, with dense molecular clouds lying along the borders, such as those in the constellations of Ophiuchus and Taurus. (The actual distance to the border of this cavity varies from 60 to 250 pc or more.) This volume contains about 104–105 stars and the local interstellar gas counterbalances the astrospheres that surround these stars, with the volume of each sphere varying depending on the local density of the interstellar medium. The Local Bubble contains dozens of warm interstellar clouds with temperatures of up to 7,000 K and radii of 0.5–5 pc.

When stars are moving at sufficiently high peculiar velocities, their astrospheres can generate bow shocks as they collide with the interstellar medium. For decades it was assumed that the Sun had a bow shock. In 2012, data from Interstellar Boundary Explorer (IBEX) and NASA's Voyager probes showed that the Sun's bow shock does not exist. Instead, these authors argue that a subsonic bow wave defines the transition from the solar wind flow to the interstellar medium. A bow shock is the third boundary of an astrosphere after the termination shock and the astropause (called the heliopause in the Solar System).

Intergalactic space 

Intergalactic space is the physical space between galaxies. Studies of the large-scale distribution of galaxies show that the Universe has a foam-like structure, with groups and clusters of galaxies lying along filaments that occupy about a tenth of the total space. The remainder forms huge voids that are mostly empty of galaxies. Typically, a void spans a distance of 7–30 megaparsecs.

Surrounding and stretching between galaxies, there is a rarefied plasma that is organized in a galactic filamentary structure. This material is called the intergalactic medium (IGM). The density of the IGM is 5–200 times the average density of the Universe. It consists mostly of ionized hydrogen; i.e. a plasma consisting of equal numbers of electrons and protons. As gas falls into the intergalactic medium from the voids, it heats up to temperatures of 105 K to 107 K, which is high enough so that collisions between atoms have enough energy to cause the bound electrons to escape from the hydrogen nuclei; this is why the IGM is ionized. At these temperatures, it is called the warm–hot intergalactic medium (WHIM). (Although the plasma is very hot by terrestrial standards, 105 K is often called "warm" in astrophysics.) Computer simulations and observations indicate that up to half of the atomic matter in the Universe might exist in this warm–hot, rarefied state. When gas falls from the filamentary structures of the WHIM into the galaxy clusters at the intersections of the cosmic filaments, it can heat up even more, reaching temperatures of 108 K and above in the so-called intracluster medium (ICM).

History of discovery 

In 350 BCE, Greek philosopher Aristotle suggested that nature abhors a vacuum, a principle that became known as the horror vacui. This concept built upon a 5th-century BCE ontological argument by the Greek philosopher Parmenides, who denied the possible existence of a void in space. Based on this idea that a vacuum could not exist, in the West it was widely held for many centuries that space could not be empty. As late as the 17th century, the French philosopher René Descartes argued that the entirety of space must be filled.

In ancient China, the 2nd-century astronomer Zhang Heng became convinced that space must be infinite, extending well beyond the mechanism that supported the Sun and the stars. The surviving books of the Hsüan Yeh school said that the heavens were boundless, "empty and void of substance". Likewise, the "sun, moon, and the company of stars float in the empty space, moving or standing still".

The Italian scientist Galileo Galilei knew that air had mass and so was subject to gravity. In 1640, he demonstrated that an established force resisted the formation of a vacuum. It would remain for his pupil Evangelista Torricelli to create an apparatus that would produce a partial vacuum in 1643. This experiment resulted in the first mercury barometer and created a scientific sensation in Europe. The French mathematician Blaise Pascal reasoned that if the column of mercury was supported by air, then the column ought to be shorter at higher altitude where the air pressure is lower. In 1648, his brother-in-law, Florin Périer, repeated the experiment on the Puy de Dôme mountain in central France and found that the column was shorter by three inches. This decrease in pressure was further demonstrated by carrying a half-full balloon up a mountain and watching it gradually expand, then contract upon descent.

In 1650, German scientist Otto von Guericke constructed the first vacuum pump: a device that would further refute the principle of horror vacui. He correctly noted that the atmosphere of the Earth surrounds the planet like a shell, with the density gradually declining with altitude. He concluded that there must be a vacuum between the Earth and the Moon.

Back in the 15th century, German theologian Nicolaus Cusanus speculated that the Universe lacked a center and a circumference. He believed that the Universe, while not infinite, could not be held as finite as it lacked any bounds within which it could be contained. These ideas led to speculations as to the infinite dimension of space by the Italian philosopher Giordano Bruno in the 16th century. He extended the Copernican heliocentric cosmology to the concept of an infinite Universe filled with a substance he called aether, which did not resist the motion of heavenly bodies. English philosopher William Gilbert arrived at a similar conclusion, arguing that the stars are visible to us only because they are surrounded by a thin aether or a void. This concept of an aether originated with ancient Greek philosophers, including Aristotle, who conceived of it as the medium through which the heavenly bodies move.

The concept of a Universe filled with a luminiferous aether retained support among some scientists until the early 20th century. This form of aether was viewed as the medium through which light could propagate. In 1887, the Michelson–Morley experiment tried to detect the Earth's motion through this medium by looking for changes in the speed of light depending on the direction of the planet's motion. The null result indicated something was wrong with the concept. The idea of the luminiferous aether was then abandoned. It was replaced by Albert Einstein's theory of special relativity, which holds that the speed of light in a vacuum is a fixed constant, independent of the observer's motion or frame of reference.

The first professional astronomer to support the concept of an infinite Universe was the Englishman Thomas Digges in 1576. But the scale of the Universe remained unknown until the first successful measurement of the distance to a nearby star in 1838 by the German astronomer Friedrich Bessel. He showed that the star system 61 Cygni had a parallax of just 0.31 arcseconds (compared to the modern value of 0.287″). This corresponds to a distance of over 10 light years. In 1917, Heber Curtis noted that novae in spiral nebulae were, on average, 10 magnitudes fainter than galactic novae, suggesting that the former are 100 times further away. The distance to the Andromeda Galaxy was determined in 1923 by American astronomer Edwin Hubble by measuring the brightness of cepheid variables in that galaxy, a new technique discovered by Henrietta Leavitt. This established that the Andromeda galaxy, and by extension all galaxies, lay well outside the Milky Way.

The modern concept of outer space is based on the "Big Bang" cosmology, first proposed in 1931 by the Belgian physicist Georges Lemaître. This theory holds that the universe originated from a very dense form that has since undergone continuous expansion.

The earliest known estimate of the temperature of outer space was by the Swiss physicist Charles É. Guillaume in 1896. Using the estimated radiation of the background stars, he concluded that space must be heated to a temperature of 5–6 K. British physicist Arthur Eddington made a similar calculation to derive a temperature of 3.18 K in 1926. German physicist Erich Regener used the total measured energy of cosmic rays to estimate an intergalactic temperature of 2.8 K in 1933. American physicists Ralph Alpher and Robert Herman predicted 5 K for the temperature of space in 1948, based on the gradual decrease in background energy following the then-new Big Bang theory. The modern measurement of the cosmic microwave background is about 2.7K.

The term outward space was used in 1842 by the English poet Lady Emmeline Stuart-Wortley in her poem "The Maiden of Moscow". The expression outer space was used as an astronomical term by Alexander von Humboldt in 1845. It was later popularized in the writings of H. G. Wells in 1901. The shorter term space is older, first used to mean the region beyond Earth's sky in John Milton's Paradise Lost in 1667. "Spaceborne" denotes existing in outer space, especially if carried by a spacecraft; similarly, "space-based" means based in outer space or using space technology.

Exploration 

For most of human history, space was explored by observations made from the Earth's surface—initially with the unaided eye and then with the telescope. Before reliable rocket technology, the closest that humans had come to reaching outer space was through balloon flights. This was followed by the first human spaceflight in 1961, when Yuri Gagarin was sent into orbit on Vostok 1.

The first spacecraft to reach escape velocity was the Soviet Luna 1, which performed a fly-by of the Moon in 1959. In 1961, Venera 1 became the first planetary probe. It revealed the presence of the solar wind and performed the first fly-by of Venus, although contact was lost before reaching Venus. The first successful planetary mission was the 1962 fly-by of Venus by Mariner 2. The first fly-by of Mars was by Mariner 4 in 1964. Since that time, uncrewed spacecraft have successfully examined each of the Solar System's planets, as well their moons and many minor planets and comets. They remain a fundamental tool for the exploration of outer space, as well as for observation of the Earth. In August 2012, Voyager 1 became the first man-made object to leave the Solar System and enter interstellar space.

Application 

The absence of air makes outer space an ideal location for astronomy at all wavelengths of the electromagnetic spectrum. This is evidenced by the spectacular pictures sent back by the Hubble Space Telescope, allowing light from more than 13 billion years ago—almost to the time of the Big Bang—to be observed. Not every location in space is ideal for a telescope. The interplanetary zodiacal dust emits a diffuse near-infrared radiation that can mask the emission of faint sources such as extrasolar planets. Moving an infrared telescope out past the dust increases its effectiveness. Likewise, a site like the Daedalus crater on the far side of the Moon could shield a radio telescope from the radio frequency interference that hampers Earth-based observations.

Uncrewed spacecraft in Earth orbit are an essential technology of modern civilization. They allow direct monitoring of weather conditions, relay long-range communications like television, provide a means of precise navigation, and allow remote sensing of the Earth. The latter role serves a wide variety of purposes, including tracking soil moisture for agriculture, prediction of water outflow from seasonal snow packs, detection of diseases in plants and trees, and surveillance of military activities.

The deep vacuum of space could make it an attractive environment for certain industrial processes, such as those requiring ultraclean surfaces. Like asteroid mining, space manufacturing would require a large financial investment with little prospect of immediate return. An important factor in the total expense is the high cost of placing mass into Earth orbit: $–$ per kg, according to a 2006 estimate (allowing for inflation since then). The cost of access to space has declined since 2013. Partially reusable rockets such as the Falcon 9 have lowered access to space below 3500 dollars per kilogram. With these new rockets the cost to send materials into space remains prohibitively high for many industries. Proposed concepts for addressing this issue include, fully reusable launch systems, non-rocket spacelaunch, momentum exchange tethers, and space elevators.

Interstellar travel for a human crew remains at present only a theoretical possibility. The distances to the nearest stars mean it would require new technological developments and the ability to safely sustain crews for journeys lasting several decades. For example, the Daedalus Project study, which proposed a spacecraft powered by the fusion of deuterium and helium-3, would require 36 years to reach the "nearby" Alpha Centauri system. Other proposed interstellar propulsion systems include light sails, ramjets, and beam-powered propulsion. More advanced propulsion systems could use antimatter as a fuel, potentially reaching relativistic velocities.

In addition to astronomy and space travel, the ultracold temperature of outer space can be used as a renewable cooling technology for various applications on Earth through passive daytime radiative cooling, which enhances longwave infrared (LWIR) thermal radiation heat transfer on the Earth's surface through the infrared window into outer space to lower ambient temperatures. It became possible with the discovery to suppress solar heating with photonic metamaterials.

See also 

 Earth's location in the Universe
 List of government space agencies
 List of topics in space
 Olbers' paradox
 Outline of space science
 Panspermia
 Space and survival
 Space environment
 Space race
 Space station
 Space technology
 Space weather
 Space weathering
 Timeline of knowledge about the interstellar and intergalactic medium
 Timeline of Solar System exploration
 Timeline of spaceflight

References

Citations

Sources 

 
 
 
  Note: this source gives a value of  molecules per cubic meter.
 
 
 
  Note: a light year is about 1013 km.
 
 
 
 
 
 
 
 
 
 
 
 
 
 
 
 
 
 
 
 
 
 
 
 
 
 
 
 
 
 
 
 
 
 
 
 
 
 
 
 
 
 
 
 </ref>

External links 

 
Environments
Vacuum